HMS Jason was a 38-gun  fifth-rate frigate of the Royal Navy. She served during the French Revolutionary Wars, but her career came to an end after just four years in service when she struck an uncharted rock off Brest and sank on 13 October 1798. She had already had an eventful career, and was involved in several engagements with French vessels.

Construction
Jason was ordered on 1 April 1793 and was laid down that month at the yards of John Dudman, at Deptford. She was launched on 3 April 1794 and had been completed at Deptford Dockyard by 25 July 1794. She cost £16,632 to build; this rising to a total of £22,567 when the cost of fitting her for service was included. Jason was commissioned in May 1794 under her first commander, Captain James Douglas.

Career
Jason initially served in the English Channel, at first under Douglas, and then by 1795 under Captain Charles Stirling. Stirling remained the Jasons commander for the rest of her career. In a highly active career against French shipping he took at least six French vessels, including two that later became part of the Royal Navy.

Jason was present at the Quiberon expedition in October 1795 as part of John Borlase Warren's squadron, and went on to be highly active against French privateers and raiders. In December 1796 she was part of the British squadron that frustrated the French Expédition d'Irlande, capturing the disarmed frigate . Further service in the Channel followed; Jason captured the 14-gun privateer Marie off Belle Isle on 21 November 1797, the 24-gun privateer  on 23 February 1798, and in company with  captured the 12-gun privateer Bonne Citoyenne on 20 March 1798. Marie came in the Royal Navy as HMS Halifax, Arrogante became HMS Arrogante, later renamed HMS Insolent.

Loss
HMS Jason struck an uncharted rock on 13 October 1798 while sailing off Brest and was wrecked. She was one of a handful of frigates to be lost on the dangerous Brest blockade with three of her class being lost, as well as  the following year.

Citations

Bibliography

External links
 

Frigates of the Royal Navy
Shipwrecks in the Atlantic Ocean
Shipwrecks in the Bay of Biscay
1794 ships
Maritime incidents in 1798
Ships built in Deptford
Artois-class frigates